Gilbert Street is a main street in the CBD of the centre of Adelaide, South Australia. The street was named after Thomas Gilbert, a pioneer settler who held the (then) important administrative position of Colonial Storekeeper, responsible for all Government stores.

See also

References

Streets in Adelaide